Louis Even (March 23, 1885, Montfort-sur-Meu – September 27, 1974) was a lay Christian leader and publisher who founded the social credit movement in Quebec. He co-founded and led the Pilgrims of Saint Michael, better known as the white berets, with Gilberte Côté-Mercier and was a founder of the Union of Electors, a predecessor of Réal Caouette's Ralliement créditiste.

In 1940, he ran for a seat in the House of Commons of Canada as a New Democracy candidate in Lake St-John—Roberval and came in third with over 3,000 votes.

See also
Canadian social credit movement

External links
Louis Even biographical notes from the Pilgrims of St. Michael

1885 births
1974 deaths
Canadian Roman Catholics
French emigrants to Quebec
French Roman Catholics
Founders of Catholic religious communities
New Democracy (Canada) candidates in the 1940 Canadian federal election
Canadian social crediters